The 55th Electronic Combat Group, Davis-Monthan Air Force Base, provides combat-ready EC-130H Compass Call aircraft, crews, maintenance and operational support to combatant commanders. The group is a Geographically Separated Unit (GSU) that falls under the command of the 55th Wing at Offutt AFB, NE. The group also plans and executes information operations, including information warfare and electronic attack, in support of theater campaign plans. Members of the 55 ECG conduct EC-130H aircrew initial qualification and difference training for 20 aircrew specialties and support operational and force development testing and evaluation for new aircraft systems.

41st and 43d Electronic Combat Squadrons

The 41st Electronic Combat Squadron was activated at Davis-Monthan Air Force Base in July 1980 and the 43d Electronic Combat Squadron was activated at D-M 1 April 1992. 
Accomplishing the Compass Call mission, both squadrons provide vital capabilities in the realm of electronic warfare for the Air Force and are poised for immediate deployment to specific theater contingencies. The unit's combat mission is to support tactical air, ground and naval operations by confusing the enemy's defenses and disrupting its command-and-control capabilities. However, they each have a different area of responsibility.

Both squadrons operate the EC-130H aircraft, a specially configured version of the Air Force's proven C-130 transport. To execute its unique missions, the aircraft were modified with electronic countermeasures systems, specialized jamming equipment, the capability to aerial refuel, as well as upgraded engines and avionics. Modifications made to the aircraft vary between the two squadrons, to help each squadron meet its specific mission-oriented needs.  Since coming to D-M, the 41 & 43 ECS have played a vital role during several successful contingency and combat operations. These include Operations Southern Watch, Just Cause, Desert Shield, Desert Storm, Uphold Democracy, Deny Flight, Vigilant Warrior, Provide Comfort, Decisive Edge, Deliberate Force, Enduring Freedom and Iraqi Freedom.

42d Electronic Combat Squadron

The 42d Electronic Combat Squadron provides the 55th Electronic Combat Group with combat ready Lockheed EC-130 trained aircrews. Directs all EC-130H aircrew initial academic and flying qualification, difference and requalification training for 20 different aircrew specialties with more than 200 aircrew students trained annually. Provides registrar support to students. Maintains quality control for all aspects of contracted aircrew training and manages courseware development for 17 Air Combat Command-verified syllabi. Provides the group with simulator support for both continuation and initial qualification training.

755th Aircraft Maintenance Squadron

The 755th Aircraft Maintenance Squadron provides war-fighting commanders with combat ready EC-130H Compass Call aircraft to expeditiously execute information warfare and electronic attack operations. The 755 AMXS plans and executes all on-equipment maintenance actions for 14 EC-130H and one TC-130H aircraft, including launch and recovery, scheduled inspections, servicing and component replacement. They also conduct all maintenance training, aircrew debriefing and supply functions.

755th Operations Support Squadron
The 755th Operations Support Squadron supports 55th Electronic Combat Group combat missions and contingency taskings. The 755 OSS performs command and control warfare analysis, targeting, and intelligence support and directs operational support functions including weapons and 
tactics training for all U.S. Air Force EC-130H Compass Call aircrews.

External links
55 ECG Public Webpage
55th ECG Factsheet

References

055
Electronic combat units and formations of the United States Air Force
Military units and formations in Arizona